The No. 12 School is a historic one-room schoolhouse building in rural Crawford County, Arkansas. It is a single-story wood vernacular frame structure with a small belfry and two entrances. Its date of construction is not documented, but it was being used as a district school in the late 19th century, a role it fulfilled until the area's district schools were consolidated in 1946. It has since served as a community meeting hall.

The building was listed on the National Register of Historic Places in 1996.

See also
National Register of Historic Places listings in Crawford County, Arkansas

References

School buildings on the National Register of Historic Places in Arkansas
One-room schoolhouses in Arkansas
School buildings completed in 1895
Buildings and structures in Crawford County, Arkansas
National Register of Historic Places in Crawford County, Arkansas